= Pass Island Granite =

Granite formation in Newfoundland, Canada

- Stratigraphic range: Early Devonian – Late Devonian
- Type: Formation
- Unit of: Group

Lithology
- Primary: Felsic pluton

Location
- Region: Newfoundland
- Country: Canada
- Occurrence of the Pass Island Granite in southeastern Newfoundland

The Pass Island Granite is a formation cropping out in Newfoundland.
